Carlos Rodas is a Colombian football forward. He currently plays for Cortuluá.

After beginning his career in 1994, quitting in 2002 to become a taxi driver, and then returning to the game, he came off the bench to score a free-kick at the age of 40 to help Cortuluá beat Junior F.C. for the first time in 11 years.

References

Living people
Colombian footballers
1975 births
Cortuluá footballers
Once Caldas footballers
Deportivo Pereira footballers
Deportes Quindío footballers
Deportes Tolima footballers
Independiente Medellín footballers
Atlético Huila footballers
Deportivo Pasto footballers
Association football forwards
Colombia international footballers
Sportspeople from Valle del Cauca Department